Saluda Township is one of ten townships in Jefferson County, Indiana, United States. As of the 2010 census, its population was 1,370 and it contained 619 housing units. It was created by the Jefferson County Court of Common Pleas on Feb. 13, 1817. Saluda is derived from a Native American name meaning "river of corn".

Geography
The streams of Big Saluda Creek, Farley Creek, Harts Falls Creek and Lee Creek run through this township.

Unincorporated towns
 Chelsea
 Marble Hill
 Paynesville
 Saluda

Adjacent townships
 Hanover Township (north)
 Bethlehem Township, Clark County (southeast)
 Washington Township, Clark County (southwest)
 Lexington Township, Scott County (west)
 Republican Township (northwest)

Cemeteries
The township contains the following cemeteries: Barnes, Harrell (also called Fairview), Maddox, Marble Hill (also called Bowman), Marling, Mt. Zion, New Bethel Methodist Church, New Prospect, Swan

Major highways
  Indiana State Road 62
  Indiana State Road 356

References
 U.S. Board on Geographic Names (GNIS)
 United States Census Bureau cartographic boundary files

External links
 Indiana Township Association
 United Township Association of Indiana

Townships in Jefferson County, Indiana
Townships in Indiana